Karbas Saray, also rendered as Karbas Sara, may refer to:
 Karbas Saray-e Olya
 Karbas Saray-e Sofla